San Fernando, officially the Municipality of San Fernando,  is a second-class municipality in the province of Cebu, Philippines. According to the 2020 census, it has a population of 72,224 people.

San Fernando is bordered to the north by the City of Naga, to the west is the town of Pinamungajan, to the east is the Cebu Strait, and to the south is the city of Carcar.

San Fernando lies within Metro Cebu.

Geography

Barangays
San Fernando comprises 21 barangays:

Climate

Demographics

Economy

Notable personalities

 Beatrice Gomez
 Jessica Villarubin

References

Sources

External links
 [ Philippine Standard Geographic Code]

Municipalities of Cebu
Municipalities in Metro Cebu